The 1991 CFL season is considered to be the 38th season in modern-day Canadian football, although it is officially the 34th Canadian Football League season.

CFL News in 1991
Harry Ornest sold the Toronto Argonauts to Bruce McNall, Wayne Gretzky and John Candy on Monday, February 25. On Wednesday, July 24, the Board of Directors of the Ottawa Rough Riders resigned, causing the CFL to assume the ownership duties of the franchise, two days later. Three months later, the Rough Riders were sold by the CFL to Bernie and Lonie Glieberman on Saturday, October 19. Furthermore, the Calgary Stampeders was purchased by Larry Ryckman from Stampeder Football Club Limited on Friday, October 24.

All eight clubs combined for a record 64.2 points per game and attendance figures broke the 2 million mark for the 10th time in CFL history (2,001,858). The Grey Cup game was hosted by the city of Winnipeg for the first time on Sunday, November 24. In that game, the Toronto Argonauts defeated the Calgary Stampeders 36–21 in front of 51,985 football fans. The Grey Cup game was also the most-watched Canadian television show with an audience of 3,531,000 viewers.

J. Donald Crump resigned as CFL Commissioner on Tuesday, December 31.

After the shutdown of the Canadian Football Network, this left the CFL with two television outlets: CBC Television, which had coverage for some regular season games and exclusive coverage of all CFL playoff games, including the Grey Cup game, and TSN on cable, airing some regular season games.

Regular season standings

Final regular season standings
Note: GP = Games Played, W = Wins, L = Losses, T = Ties, PF = Points For, PA = Points Against, Pts = Points

Bold text means that they have clinched the playoffs.
Edmonton and Toronto have first round byes.

Grey Cup playoffs

The Toronto Argonauts are the 1991 Grey Cup champions, defeating the Calgary Stampeders 36–21, at Winnipeg Stadium.  This was the first championship for the Argonauts in eight years.  The Argonauts’ Raghib "Rocket" Ismail (WR) was named the Grey Cup's Most Valuable Player and Stampeder's Dave Sapunjis (SB) was the Grey Cup's Most Valuable Canadian.

Playoff bracket

CFL Leaders
 CFL Passing Leaders
 CFL Rushing Leaders
 CFL Receiving Leaders

1991 CFL All-Stars

Offence
QB – Doug Flutie, BC Lions
FB – Blake Marshall, Edmonton Eskimos
RB – Robert Mimbs, Winnipeg Blue Bombers
SB – Matt Clark, BC Lions
SB – Allen Pitts, Calgary Stampeders
WR – Ray Alexander, BC Lions
WR – Raghib "Rocket" Ismail, Toronto Argonauts
C – Rod Connop, Edmonton Eskimos
OG – Leo Groenewegen, BC Lions
OG – Dan Ferrone, Toronto Argonauts
OT – Jim Mills, BC Lions
OT – Chris Walby, Winnipeg Blue Bombers

Defence
DT – Harold Hallman, Toronto Argonauts
DT – Brett Williams, Edmonton Eskimos
DE – Will Johnson, Calgary Stampeders
DE – Mike Campbell, Toronto Argonauts
LB – Willie Pless, Edmonton Eskimos
LB – Darryl Ford, Toronto Argonauts
LB – Greg Battle, Winnipeg Blue Bombers
CB – Less Browne, Winnipeg Blue Bombers
CB – Junior Thurman, Calgary Stampeders
DB – Darryl Hall, Calgary Stampeders
DB – Don Wilson, Toronto Argonauts
DS – Glen Suitor, Saskatchewan Roughriders

Special teams
P – Hank Ilesic, Toronto Argonauts
K – Lance Chomyc, Toronto Argonauts
ST – Henry "Gizmo" Williams, Edmonton Eskimos

1991 Eastern All-Stars

Offence
QB – Damon Allen, Ottawa Rough Riders
FB – David Conrad, Ottawa Rough Riders
RB – Robert Mimbs, Winnipeg Blue Bombers
SB – Rob Crifo, Winnipeg Blue Bombers
SB – Darrell Smith, Toronto Argonauts
WR – David Williams, Toronto Argonauts
WR – Raghib "Rocket" Ismail, Toronto Argonauts
C – Irv Daymond, Ottawa Rough Riders
OG – Gerald Roper, Ottawa Rough Riders
OG – Dan Ferrone, Toronto Argonauts
OT – Chris Schultz, Toronto Argonauts
OT – Chris Walby, Winnipeg Blue Bombers

Defence
DT – Harold Hallman, Toronto Argonauts
DT – Lloyd Lewis, Ottawa Rough Riders
DE – Brian Warren, Toronto Argonauts
DE – Mike Campbell, Toronto Argonauts
LB – Brian Bonner, Ottawa Rough Riders
LB – Darryl Ford, Toronto Argonauts
LB – Greg Battle, Winnipeg Blue Bombers
CB – Less Browne, Winnipeg Blue Bombers
CB – Reggie Pleasant, Toronto Argonauts
DB – Anthony Drawhorn, Ottawa Rough Riders
DB – Don Wilson, Toronto Argonauts
DS – Scott Flagel, Ottawa Rough Riders

Special teams
P – Hank Ilesic, Toronto Argonauts
K – Lance Chomyc, Toronto Argonauts
ST – Raghib "Rocket" Ismail, Toronto Argonauts

1991 Western All-Stars

Offence
QB – Doug Flutie, BC Lions
FB – Blake Marshall, Edmonton Eskimos
RB – Jon Volpe, BC Lions
SB – Matt Clark, BC Lions
SB – Allen Pitts, Calgary Stampeders
WR – Ray Alexander, BC Lions
WR – Jim Sandusky, Edmonton Eskimos
C – Rod Connop, Edmonton Eskimos
OG – Leo Groenewegen, BC Lions
OG – Roger Aldag, Saskatchewan Roughriders
OT – Jim Mills, BC Lions
OT – Vic Stevenson, Saskatchewan Roughriders

Defence
DT – Gary Lewis, Saskatchewan Roughriders
DT – Brett Williams, Edmonton Eskimos
DE – Will Johnson, Calgary Stampeders
DE – Stewart Hill, BC Lions
LB – Willie Pless, Edmonton Eskimos
LB – O.J. Brigance, BC Lions
LB – Alondra Johnson, Calgary Stampeders
CB – Eddie Thomas, Edmonton Eskimos
CB – Junior Thurman, Calgary Stampeders
DB – Darryl Hall, Calgary Stampeders
DB – Enis Jackson, Edmonton Eskimos
DS – Glen Suitor, Saskatchewan Roughriders

Special teams
P – Brent Matich, Calgary Stampeders
K – Dave Ridgway, Saskatchewan Roughriders
ST – Henry "Gizmo" Williams, Edmonton Eskimos

1991 CFL Awards
CFL's Most Outstanding Player Award – Doug Flutie (QB), BC Lions
CFL's Most Outstanding Canadian Award – Blake Marshall (FB), Edmonton Eskimos
CFL's Most Outstanding Defensive Player Award – Greg Battle (LB), Winnipeg Blue Bombers
CFL's Most Outstanding Offensive Lineman Award – Jim Mills (OT), BC Lions
CFL's Most Outstanding Rookie Award – Jon Volpe (RB), BC Lions
CFLPA's Outstanding Community Service Award – Stu Laird (LB), Calgary Stampeders
CFL's Coach of the Year – Adam Rita, Toronto Argonauts
Commissioner's Award - Jake Matheson, Winnipeg

References 

CFL
1991